Butta la luna (Throw the Moon) is an Italian television series.

Cast

 Fiona May: Alyssa Calangida
 Chiara Conti: Cosima Calangida 
 Roberto Farnesi: Dr. Luca Ferrari (season 2) 
 Giampaolo Morelli: Nicola Argenzi
 Andrea Tidona: Attilio Argenzi
 Vanessa Gravina: Sandra Morabito  (season 2) 
 Isa Barzizza: Egle
 Juliet Esey Joseph: Fatma Calangida
 Nino Frassica: Mario Ficuzza 
 Giuliano Gemma: Luigi Zagari
 Anita Zagaria: Elena Marini
 Regina Bianchi: Nonna Cosima
 Lola Ponce: Isabel Diaz
 Carla Macelloni: Vicina degli Argenzi

See also
List of Italian television series

External links
 

Italian television series